Yekaterinovka is a rural locality (a sloboda) in Petrovskoye Rural Settlement, Liskinsky District, Voronezh Oblast, Russia. The population was 251 as of 2010. There are 3 streets.

Geography 
Yekaterinovka is located 22 km southeast of Liski (the district's administrative centre) by road. Petrovskoye is the nearest rural locality.

References 

Rural localities in Liskinsky District